A persimmon is the edible fruit of a number of species of trees in the genus Diospyros.

Persimmon may also refer to:

 Persimmon (color), a shade of orange
 Persimmon plc, a British housebuilding company
 Persimmon (horse), a Thoroughbred race horse who won the Epsom Derby in 1896
 Persimmon, Georgia, a community in the United States
 Miss Persimmon, a fictional character in the film Mary Poppins

See also
 Persimmon Gap, a mountain pass in Texas, US